Meg Okura (born August 9, 1973) is an American jazz violinist, composer, erhu player, and leader of the Pan Asian Chamber Jazz Ensemble, based in New York City. She is also a member of the band Pharaoh's Daughter, Emilio Solla y La Inestable de Brooklyn, which was nominated for the 57th Grammy Award for Best Latin Jazz Album, and New York Tango Quartet, among others. She has worked with jazz and pop artists such as Michael Brecker, Lee Konitz, Dianne Reeves, Steve Swallow, Tom Harrell, David Bowie and Mariko Takahashi as well as actor/musician Terrence Howard. Okura has also been the featured violinist in the Cirque du Soleil shows Varekai, Corteo and Wintuk.

Early life
Meg Okura (大倉恵, born in Tokyo, Japan), started studying music at Toho Gakuen School of Music at five. As a child, she served as a church pianist and organist at an Evangelical church in her home town of Ome. In the early 1990s, Meg Okura toured Asia as the concertmaster and soloist of the Asian Youth Orchestra. In 1992, she made her U.S. solo debut with the late Alexander Schneider and the New York String Orchestra at Kennedy Center in Washington D.C. She has earned bachelor's and master's degrees from The Juilliard School as a classical violinist.

Personal life
Meg Okura has been married to American jazz soprano saxophonist and composer Sam Newsome since 2004.

Honors and awards
Chamber Music America New Jazz Works – 2018
 
The Grammy Award, 2015 (Nominee)

Manhattan Community Arts Fund (Lower Manhattan Cultural Council)- 2013 & 2015

New Music USA Project Grant (New Music USA)- 2014

Brand Personality Award, The BrandLaureate Asia Pacific Brands Foundation)- 2012

Meet the Composer, Metlife Creative Connections Grant – 2008

Manhattan Community Art fund (LMCC)- 2008

American Composers Forum, Jerome Composers Commissioning Program- 2007–2008

Meet the Composer, Metlife Creative Connections Grant
Urban Artist Initiative / NYC – 2006

2005 International Songwriting Competition (Honorable Mention)

2005 American University Saxophone Symposium Composition Contest (Honorable Mention)

The 2003 John Lennon Songwriting Contest (Honorable Mention)

The 2000 John Lennon Songwriting Contest (Honorable Mention)

Discography
As A Leader
IMA IMA by Pan Asian Chamber Jazz Ensemble (2018) – featuring Tom Harrell
NPO Trio Live at The Stone (2018)
Las Vegas Tango (2013)
Music of Ryuichi Sakamoto by Pan Asian Chamber Jazz Ensemble (2013)
Naima (Pan Asian Chamber Jazz Ensemble) (2010)
Meg Okura's Pan Asian Chamber Jazz Ensemble (2006)
Be Thou My Vision (Life Music Japan)
Peace In My Heart (Life Music Japan)(1998)
Never Alone (Life Music Japan)(2000)

References

 CD Universe
 All Music

External links
 Official website
 Chording to Meg Blogspot

Japanese violinists
Living people
1973 births
Musicians from Tokyo
Juilliard School alumni
Musicians from New York City
Chamber jazz musicians
Pharaoh's Daughter members
21st-century violinists
People from Ōme, Tokyo